Rezza may refer to:

 Rezza, a commune in the Corse-du-Sud department of France on the island of Corsica

 Rezza Gaznavi (born 1992), a Singaporean cricketer
 Rezza Rezky (born 2000), a Singaporean professional footballer
 Sheikh Rezza Talabani, a celebrated Kurdish poet from Kirkuk, Iraq
 Sol Rezza (born 1982), a composer, audio engineer and radio producer